Reino Kalevi Fagerlund (28 December 1953 – 9 October 2019) was a Finnish judoka. He competed in the men's extra-lightweight event at the 1980 Summer Olympics.

References

1953 births
2019 deaths
Finnish male judoka
Olympic judoka of Finland
Judoka at the 1980 Summer Olympics
Sportspeople from Pori